José da Silva may refer to:
 José da Silva (canoeist) (born 1971), Portuguese Olympic canoer
 José da Silva (sport shooter), Portuguese Olympic shooter in 1948
 José Alves Correia da Silva (1872–1957), Bishop of Leiria
 José Alencar (1931–2011), Gomes da Silva, Brazilian politician, vice president of Brazil from 2003 to 2010
 José Cláudio Ribeiro da Silva (1957–2011), Brazilian conservationist and environmentalist
 José da Silva (footballer, born 1991), São Toméan footballer who plays for UDRA

See also 
 Jose Silva (disambiguation)